

Notable people with the name include

A
Quinn Allman (born 1982), American musician

B
Quinn Bailey (born 1995), American football player
Quinn H. Becker (born 1930), American Army general
Quinn Bradlee (born 1982), American filmmaker and writer
Quinn Buckner (born 1954), American basketball player

C
Quinn Carpenter (born 1996), American ice dancer
Quinn Christopherson, American singer-songwriter
Quinn Cook (born 1993), American basketball player
Quinn Cummings (born 1967), American actress and writer

D
Quinn Do (born 1975), American poker player
Quinn Duffy (born 1970), American actor
Quinn Dupree

E
Quinn Early (born 1965), American football player
Quinn Ewers (born 2003), American football player

F
Quinn Farrell (born 2002), Virgin Island soccer player

G
Quinn Gleason (born 1994), American tennis player
Quinn Golden (1954–2003), American singer
Quinn Gray (born 1979), American football player 
Quinn Grovey (born 1968), American football player

H
Quinn Hughes (born 1999), American ice hockey player

J
Quinn Johnson (born 1986), American football player
Quinn Josiah (born 2000), Canadian soccer player

K
Quinn Kelsey (born 1978), American operatic baritone

L
Quinn Lord (born 1999), Canadian actor

M
Quinn Mack (born 1965), American baseball player
Quinn Marston (born 1988), American singer-songwriter and painter
Quinn Martin (1922–1987), American television producer
Quinn McColgan (born 2002), American actress
Quinn McDowell (born 1990), American basketball player and coach
Quinn G. McKay (born 1926), American missionary
Quinn McNemar (1930–1986), American psychologist and statistician
Quinn Meinerz (born 1998), American football player
Quinn Mulhern (born 1984), American mixed martial artist

N
Quinn Ngawati (born 1999), Canadian rugby union player
Quinn Nordin (born 1998), American football player
Quinn Norton (born 1973), American journalist

O
Quinn O'Hara (1941–2017), Scottish-American actress
Quinn Ojinnaka (born 1984), American football player and professional wrestler

P
Quinn Paynter (born 1961), Bermudian boxer
Quinn Pitcock (born 1983), American football player
Quinn Porter (born 1986), American football player
Quinn Priester (born 2000), American baseball player

Q
Quinn (born 1995), Canadian soccer player

R
Quinn Redeker (1936–2022), American actor and screenwriter
Quinn Roux (born 1990), South African-Irish rugby union player

S
Quinn Sharp (born 1989), American football player
Quinn Shephard (born 1995), American actress 
Quinn Simmons (born 2001), American road cyclist
Quinn Slobodian (born 1978), Canadian historian
Quinn Smith (born 1991), Canadian football player
Quinn Sullivan (musician) (born 1999), American blues-rock guitarist
Quinn Sullivan (soccer) (born 2004), American soccer player
Quinn Sutton, American technology executive
Quinn Sypniewski (born 1982), American football player

T
Quinn Tamm (1910–1986), American law enforcement executive
Quinn Tupaea (born 1999), New Zealand rugby union player

W
Quinn Weng (born 1979), Taiwanese singer
Quinn Wheeler (born 1974), Virgin Island bobsledder
Quinn Wilder, Canadian romance novelist
Quinn Wilmans (born 1982), South African figure skater
Quinn Wilson (1908–1978), American jazz bassist and tubist
Quinn Wolcott (born 1986), American baseball umpire

Fictional characters
Quinn Darian in the television series The Godzilla Power Hour
Quinn Fuller in the American Daytime Soap Opera The Bold and the Beautiful
Quinn Fabray in the television series Glee
Quinn Garvey in the television series How I Met Your Mother
Quinn James in the television series One Tree Hill
Quinn Mallory in the television series Sliders
Quinn Morgendorffer in the television series Daria
Quinn Pensky in the Nickelodeon live-action sitcom Zoey 101
Quinn Perkins in the TV series Scandal
Quinn the Eskimo in the song The Mighty Quinn
Quinn, Demacia's Wings, a playable champion character in the multiplayer online battle arena video game League of Legends
Quinn, an NPC from Etrian Odyssey
Quinn the puffin, a recurring character in the British television programme 3rd & Bird
Quinn (Prison Break character) in the American television series Prison Break
Quinn Mossbacher in the television series The White Lotus

See also
Quinn (surname)
O'Quinn, a surname
Quin (disambiguation), including a list of people with the given name or surname

English-language unisex given names
Irish unisex given names